Denny Moyer (August 8, 1939 – June 30, 2010) was an American boxer who held the world light middleweight title between 1962 and 1963. He finished his career with a 98–38–4 record.

Early life
Moyer was born in Portland, Oregon, and  attended Central Catholic High School. He was the younger brother of Phil Moyer, another of Portland's finest professional boxers. Both Denny and Phil were trained as amateur boxers by their uncle, Tommy Moyer, who had been a national AAU boxing champion.

Early professional career
Moyer fought Don Jordan for the world welterweight title on July 7, 1959, after just 21 professional bouts, in his home town of Portland. Moyer was outpointed, making the world title shot his first defeat. He continued to box in the best company for two years, and then won the vacant World light-middleweight title by gaining a points win over Joey Giambra. After one successful defense, he lost the title to Ralph Dupas on points.

Sugar Ray Robinson bouts
Perhaps the most distinctive place in the history of boxing, that the boxing Moyer family from Portland will hold is that all three boxed the famous Sugar Ray Robinson. Uncle Tommy Moyer lost to Sugar Ray in New York as an amateur. Denny Moyer fought Sugar Ray in New York twice as a pro, losing the first fight on points but winning the second by 7-3 scores on all three cards. Phil Moyer had his chance with the legendary Robinson in a bout in Woodland Hills, California. He too outpointed Sugar Ray, giving the Moyer family a very respectable 2 - 2 record against one of the sports most celebrated champions.

Later career
Moyer became a middleweight and in 1970 won the American middleweight title by out pointing Eddie Pace. He lost and regained this title, then challenged Carlos Monzón for the world crown in Rome, but was stopped in five rounds. Moyer continued to fight for another three years before retiring in 1975.

After boxing
After his boxing career, Moyer worked in real estate and owned a construction company. The website, Eastside Boxing reported in February 2004, that Moyer was in a Portland nursing home. Moyer died of complications from dementia pugilistica on June 30, 2010.

Amateur and professional achievements 
1956 Runner-up National AAU Welterweight Championships
1957 National AAU Welterweight Champion
1963 Jr. Middleweight Champion of the World
1971 Las Vegas Boxer of the Year
1983 Oregon Sports Hall of Fame
2001 World Boxing Hall of Fame

Professional boxing record

See also
List of world light-middleweight boxing champions

References

External lists

Denny Moyer - CBZ Profile

Boxers from Portland, Oregon
1939 births
2010 deaths
Central Catholic High School (Portland, Oregon) alumni
Deaths from dementia in Oregon
American male boxers
Winners of the United States Championship for amateur boxers
World Boxing Association champions
World Boxing Council champions
Light-middleweight boxers
World light-middleweight boxing champions
Sportspeople with chronic traumatic encephalopathy